Choi Da-bin (Hangul: 최다빈; born January 19, 2000) is a South Korean figure skater. She is the 2017 Asian Winter Games champion and a 5-time South Korean national medalist (three silver, two bronze). She has placed in the top ten at the 2018 Winter Olympics, the 2017 World Championships, the Four Continents Championships (2016, 2017, 2018). Earlier in her career, she won two bronze medals during the 2015–16 ISU Junior Grand Prix series in Austria and Latvia. She has placed in the top ten at the World Junior Championships (2014, 2015).

Personal life 
Choi was born on January 19, 2000, in Seoul. She attended Suri High School as a student, same as fellow skater Kim Yuna .

Choi's mother died on June 26, 2017, while battling cancer. Choi has said that her mother was her biggest supporter and fan. Her 2017-18 season short program 'Papa Can You Hear Me?' is dedicated to her.

Career

Early years 
As a nine-year-old, Choi won the novice silver medal at the 2010 South Korean Nationals. Competing on the senior level, she won bronze medals at the 2012 and 2013 Nationals.

2013–2014 season: Junior international debut 
In the 2013–14 season, Choi debuted on the ISU Junior Grand Prix series, finishing fourth and fifth at her two events.
At the 2014 World Junior Championships in Sofia, Bulgaria, she placed ninth in the short program, sixth in the free skate, and sixth overall, setting a new personal best score of 162.35 points.

2014–2015 season 

In the 2014–15 season, Choi finished fourth and fifth at her JGP events in France and Japan. At the 2015 South Korean Nationals, she placed second in both programs to win silver behind Park So-youn. At the 2015 World Junior Championships, she placed ninth in both programs and ninth overall, thus securing two spots for her country at the 2016 edition.

2015–2016 season: Two JGP medals and senior international debut 

In the 2015–16 season, Choi won her first JGP medals, taking bronze in Riga, Latvia, and Linz, Austria. Making her senior international debut, Choi finished eighth at the 2015 CS Tallinn Trophy. At the 2015 KSU President Cup Ranking Competition, she won her first gold medal at a national competition. At the 2016 Four Continents Championships in Taipei, Taiwan, she placed 8th with personal bests in the free skate and total scores.

2016–2017 season: Winter Asian Games champion 
Making her senior Grand Prix debut, Choi placed 7th at the 2016 Skate Canada International and 8th at the 2016 NHK Trophy. She placed fourth at the 2017 South Korean Championships. She changed her short program music from Qué rico el mambo into Steven Universe and La La Land in the middle of the season. She also changed coaches, deciding to join Lee Eun-hee. She placed fifth at the 2017 Four Continents Championships in Gangneung, South Korea, improving her personal best scores in all categories.

Called up to replace the injured Park So-youn at the 2017 Asian Winter Games in Sapporo, Japan, Choi won her country's first-ever figure skating gold medal at the event. South Korea also selected Choi to replace the injured Kim Na-hyun at the 2017 World Championships in Helsinki, Finland. She would place tenth in Finland, allowing her country to send two ladies' single skaters to the 2018 Winter Olympics in Pyeongchang and 2018 World Championships in Milan.

2017–2018 season: 2018 Winter Olympics 

Choi began the season competing at the 2017 CS Ondrej Nepela Trophy, placing fourth.  At the first of her two assignments on the 2017-18 Grand Prix circuit, the 2017 Cup of China, she placed a disappointing ninth, hampered by a foot injury.  She subsequently withdrew from her second Grand Prix event at the 2017 Skate America as a result of the injury.

Choi and Kim Ha-nul were selected to compete at both the 2018 Winter Olympics in PyeongChang, South Korea, and the 2018 World Figure Skating Championships in Milan, Italy. They were joined by Park So-youn for the 2018 Four Continents Figure Skating Championships in Taipei, Taiwan.

At the Four Continents Championships, Choi missed the podium, coming in fourth just behind Japan's Satoko Miyahara.  Choi reverted to her Doctor Zhivago free skate program for this and all subsequent competitions for the season, citing the difficulty in performing its replacement to the standard she desired.

Choi received a standing ovation for her short program at the Olympics, including from South Korea's Yuna Kim.  She set personal bests in both the short program and free skate and finished seventh overall.  Her short program for the season, set to "Papa, Can You Hear Me?" was dedicated to her mother, who had died shortly before the South Korean qualifying event.  Choi commented following her performance in the team event: "I am very thankful to my mother, who is watching me from Heaven."

After skating the short program at the 2018 World Championships, Choi was compelled to withdraw due to equipment failure.

Programs

Competitive highlights

2013–14 to present 
GP: Grand Prix; CS: Challenger Series; JGP: Junior Grand Prix

2007–08 to 2012–13: Pre-junior international debut

Detailed results

Senior level 

At team events, medals are awarded for team results only.

Junior level 

 Personal bests highlighted in bold.

References

Further reading
 
 2013 Asian Figure Skating Trophy Results
 2012 Asian Figure Skating Trophy Results
 2011 Asian Figure Skating Trophy Results

External links 

 
Choi Da-bin's Facebook 
 

2000 births
Living people
South Korean female single skaters
Figure skaters from Seoul
Figure skaters at the 2017 Asian Winter Games
Figure skaters at the 2018 Winter Olympics
Olympic figure skaters of South Korea
Asian Games medalists in figure skating
Medalists at the 2017 Asian Winter Games
Asian Games gold medalists for South Korea
Competitors at the 2023 Winter World University Games
21st-century South Korean women